Coherence is defined as the ability of waves to interfere. Intuitively, coherent waves have a well-defined constant phase relationship. However, an exclusive and extensive physical definition of coherence is more nuanced. Coherence functions, as introduced by Roy Glauber and others in the 1960s, capture the mathematics behind the intuition by defining correlation between the electric field components as coherence. These correlations between electric field components can be measured to arbitrary orders, hence leading to the concept of different orders of coherence. The coherence encountered in most optical experiments, including the classic Young's double slit experiment and Mach–Zehnder interferometer, is first order coherence. Robert Hanbury Brown and Richard Q. Twiss performed a correlation experiment in 1956, and brought to light a different kind of correlation between fields, namely the correlation of intensities, which correspond to second order coherence. Higher order coherences become relevant in photon-coincidence counting experiments. Orders of coherence can be measured using classical correlation functions or by using the quantum analogue of those functions, which take quantum mechanical description of electric field (operators) as input. While the quantum coherence functions might yield the same results as the classical functions, the underlying mechanism and description of the physical processes are fundamentally different because quantum interference deals with interference of possible histories while classical interference deals with interference of physical waves.

Definition 
The electric field  can be separated into its positive and negative frequency components . Either of the two frequency components, contains all the physical information about the wave. The classical first-order, second order and nth order correlation function are defined as follows
, 
, 
, 
where  represents . The first order correlation function, measured at the same time and position gives us the intensity i.e. . The classical nth order normalized correlation function is defined by dividing the nth order correlation function by all corresponding intensities: .
In quantum mechanics, the positive and negative frequency components of the electric field are replaced by the operators  and  respectively. The nth order quantum correlation function is defined as:
.
When the operators are written in the order shown in the equation above, they are said to be in a normal ordering. Subsequently, the nth order normalized correlation function is defined as:
.
A field is said to m-coherent if the mth normalized correlation function is unity.

Examples

Young double slit experiment 
In Young's double slit experiment, light from a light source is allowed to pass through two pinholes separated by some distance, and a screen is placed some distance away from the pinholes where the interference between the light waves is observed (Figure. 1). Young's double slit experiment demonstrates the dependence of interference on coherence, specifically on the first-order correlation. This experiment is equivalent to the Mach–Zehnder interferometer with the caveat that Young's double slit experiment is concerned with spatial coherence, while the Mach–Zehnder interferometer relies on temporal coherence.

The intensity measured at the position  at time  is
.

Light field has highest degree of coherence when the corresponding interference pattern has the maximum contrast on the screen.

Classically,  and hence . As coherence is the ability to interfere visibility and coherence are linked:
 means highest contrast, complete coherence
 means partial fringe visibility, partial coherence
 means no contrast, complete incoherence.

Quantum description 
Classically, the electric field at a position , is the sum of electric field components from at the two pinholes  and  earlier times  respectably i.e. . Correspondingly, in the quantum description the electric field operators are similarly related, . This implies
.
The intensity fluctuates as a function of position i.e. the quantum mechanical treatment also predicts interference fringes. Moreover, in accordance to the intuitive understanding of coherence i.e. ability to interfere, the interference patterns depend on the first-order correlation function . Comparing this to the classical intensity, we note that the only difference is that the classical normalized correlation  is now replaced by the quantum correlation . Even the computations here look strikingly similar to the ones that might be done classically. However, the quantum interference that occurs in this process is fundamentally different from the classical interference of electromagnetic waves. Quantum interference occurs when two possible histories, given a particular initial and final state, interfere. In this experiment, given an initial state of the photon before the pinhole and it final state at the screen, the two possible histories correspond to the two pinholes through which the photon could have passed. Hence, quantum mechanically, here the photon is interfering with itself. Such interference of different histories, however, occurs only when the observer has no specific way of determining which of the different histories actually occurred. If the system is observed to determine the path of the photon, then on average the interference of amplitudes will vanish.

Hanbury Brown and Twiss experiment 

In the Hanbury Brown and Twiss experiment (Figure 2.), a light beam is split using a beam splitter and then detected by detectors, which are equidistant from the beam splitter. Subsequently, signal measured by the second detector is delayed by time  and the coincidence rate between the original and delayed signal is counted. This experiment correlates intensities, rather than electric fields and hence measures the second order correlation function
.
Under the assumption of stationary statistics, at a given position, the normalized correlation function is

 here measures the probability of coincidence of two photons being detected with a time difference .

For all varieties of chaotic light, the following relationship between the first order and second-order coherences holds:

.

This relationship is true for both the classical and quantum correlation functions. Moreover, as  always takes a value between 0 and 1, for a chaotic light beam, . The light source used by Hanbury Brown and Twiss was stellar light which is chaotic. Hanbury Brown and Twiss used this result to compute the first order coherence from their measurement of the second order coherence. The observed second order coherence the curve was as shown in figure 2.

For Gaussian light source . Often a Gaussian light source is chaotic and consequently, .
This model fits the observation that was done by Hanbury Brown and Twiss using stellar light as demonstrated in figure 3. If thermal light was used instead of stellar light in the same setup, then we would see a different function for the second order coherence. Thermal light can be modeled to be a Lorentzian power spectrum centered around frequency , which means , where  is the coherence length of the beam. The second-order coherence for stellar (Gaussian), thermal (Lorentzian) and coherent light is shown in Figure 4. Note that when stellar/thermal light beam is first order coherent i.e. , the second order coherence is 2, meaning at zero time delay chaotic light right is first order coherent but not second order coherent.

Quantum description 
Classically, we can think of a light beam as having a probability distribution as a function of mode amplitudes,  and in that case, the second order correlation function .

Similar to the case of Young's double slit experiment, the classical and the quantum description lead to the same result, but that does not mean that two descriptions are equivalent. Classically, the light beams arrives as an electromagnetic wave and interferes owing to the superposition principle. The quantum description is not as straightforward. To understand the subtleties in the quantum description, assume that photons from the source are emitted independent of each other at the source and that the photons are not split by the beam splitter. When the intensity of the source is set to be very low, such that only one photon might be detected at any time, accounting for the fact that there might be accidental coincidences, which are statistically independent of time, the coincidence counter should not change with respect to the time difference. However, as shown in Figure 3., for stellar light , so without any time delay  and with a large time delay . Hence, even when there was no time-delay the photons from the source were arriving in pairs! This effect is termed photon bunching. Moreover, if a laser light was used at the source instead of chaotic light, then second order coherence would be independent of the time delay. HBT's experiment allows for a fundamentally distinction in the way in which photons are emitted from a laser compared to a natural light source. Such a distinction is not captured by the classical description on wave interference.

Mathematical properties of coherence functions 

For the purposes of standard optical experiments, coherence is just first-order coherence and higher-order coherences are generally ignored. Higher order coherences are measured in photon-coincidence counting experiments. Correlation interferometry uses coherences of fourth-order and higher to perform stellar measurements. Physically, these rate are always positive and therefore .

mth order coherent fields 

A field is called mth order coherent if there exists a function  such that all correlation functions for  factorize. Notationally, this means

This factorizability of all  correlation functions implies that . For a m-coherent field, the  photons being detected will be detected statistically independent of each other.

Upper bound the order of coherence 

Given an upper bound on how many photons can be present in the field, there is an upper bound on the Mth coherence the field can have. This is because  is proportional the annihilation operator. To see this, begin with a mixed state for the field . If this sum has an upper limit on n, m i.e. ,  is proportional to 
This result would be unintuitive in a classical description, but fortunately such a case has no classical counterpart because we cannot put an upper bound on the number of photons in the classical case.

Stationarity of the statistics 

When dealing with classical optics, physicists often employ the assumption that the statistics of the system are stationary. This means that while the observations might fluctuate, the underlying statistics of the system remains constant as time progresses. The quantum analogue of stationary statistics is to require that the density operator, which contains the information about the wavefunction, commutes with the Hamiltonian. Owing to Schrödinger equation, stationary statistics implies that the density operator is independent of time.
 .
This means that under the assumption that the underlying statistics of the system are stationary, the nth order correlation functions do not change when every time argument is translated by the same amount. In other words, rather than looking at actual times, the correlation function is only concerned with the  time differences.

Coherent states 

Coherent state are quantum mechanical states that have the maximal coherence and have the most "classical"-like behavior. A coherent state is defined as the quantum mechanical state that is the eigenstate of the electric field operator . As  is directly proportional to the annihilation operator the coherent state is an eigenstate of the annihilation operator. Given a coherent state , . Consequently, coherent states have all orders of coherences as being non-zero.

See also 
 Degree of coherence
 Hanbury Brown and Twiss effect
 Double-slit experiment
 Young's interference experiment
 Mach–Zehnder interferometer

References 

Quantum optics